Elisabethinsel (Elisabeth Island) is the mostly ice-covered island 1.6 km long in southwest–northeast direction and 880 m wide in the Dannebrog Islands group of Wilhelm Archipelago in the Antarctic Peninsula region. Its surface area is 95.12 ha.

The feature was named by German scientists as the result of an Antarctic trip in the southern summer of 1893/94.

Location
Elisabethinsel is located 3.01 km west of the westernmost extremity of Booth Island and 3 km northwest of Pléneau Island. Separated from the adjacent Stego Island on the northwest by a passage narrowing to 52 m at points. British mapping in 2001.

Maps
 British Admiralty Nautical Chart 446 Anvers Island to Renaud Island. Scale 1:150000. Admiralty, UK Hydrographic Office, 2001
 Brabant Island to Argentine Islands. Scale 1:250000 topographic map. British Antarctic Survey, 2008
 Antarctic Digital Database (ADD). Scale 1:250000 topographic map of Antarctica. Scientific Committee on Antarctic Research (SCAR). Since 1993, regularly upgraded and updated

See also
 List of Antarctic and subantarctic islands

References

External links
 Elisabethinsel. Adjusted Copernix satellite image
 Elisabethinsel. SCAR Composite Gazetteer of Antarctica
 Index of German-language Antarctic place-names. Version 2.14, 13.06.2014

Islands of the Wilhelm Archipelago